The 41st Thailand National Games (Thai:การแข่งขันกีฬาแห่งชาติ ครั้งที่ 41 "เชียงใหม่เกมส์") also known (2012 National Games, Chiang Mai Games) were held in Chiang Mai, Thailand from 5 to 19 December 2013. Represented were 43 sports and 77 disciplines. The games were held in 700th Anniversary Stadium Sport Center, etc. and Chiang Mai hosted 1995 Southeast Asian Games.

Marketing

Emblem
Wat Phra That Doi Suthep - The holy place in Chaing Mai.
The elephant - The animal in Chiang Mai seal.
The circle -  power development success.
The human hand up - Chiang Mai citizen glad to the host of this games.
Deep Blue - The color of Chiang Mai.
Gold - Prosperity 
Blue - Stable reliable.
Red - Power of success.

Mascot 
The mascots are Muan Ok and Muan Jai The elephant in Chiang Mai seal.

Ceremony

Opening ceremony
The opening ceremony of the 41st Thailand National Games was held on December 5, 2013 at 700th Anniversary Stadium.

Closing ceremony
The closing ceremony of the 41st Thailand National Games was held on December 19, 2013 at 700th Anniversary Stadium.

Provinces participating

 
 
 
 
 
 
 
 
 
  (host)
 
 
 
 
 
 
 
 
 
 
 
 		
 
 Mukdahan
 
 
 
 
 
 
 
 
 Nong Bua Lamphu
 
 
 
 
 
 
 
 				
 
 
 
 
 
 
 
 
 
 
 
 
 
 
 
 
 
 
 		
 
  
 
 
 
 
 
 
 
 
 
 
 Yasothon

Sports

Air sports
Archery
Athletics
Badminton
Basketball
Billiards and snooker
Bodybuilding
Bowling
Bridge
Boxing
Cricket
Cycling
Dancesport
Equestrian
Fencing
Field hockey
Football
Futsal
Gymnastics
Go
Golf
Handball
Judo
Kabaddi
Karate
Muay Thai
Netball
Petanque
Pencak silat
Rugby football
Rowing
Sepak takraw
Shooting
Softball
Soft tennis
Swimming
Table tennis
Taekwondo
Tennis
Volleyball
Weightlifting
Woodball
Wrestling
Wushu

Demonstration sports
Cricket
Netball

Medal tally

National Games
Thailand National Games
National Games
Thailand National Games
National Games